St Mellion is a village and rural civil parish in east Cornwall, England, United Kingdom. To the north, the parish is bordered by Callington and St Dominick parishes, to the east and south by Pillaton parish, and to the west by St Ive parish.

The population in the 2001 Census was 377. The 2011 Census recorded that this had increased to 383.

The parish name is taken from St Melaine, a 6th-century bishop of Rennes, Brittany.

Parish church
The older part of the church is the south side which was built in the 14th century whereas the north side is of the late 15th century and was built of granite. There is a series of monuments to the Corytons: these include a brass to Peter Coryton and his wife and 24 children, 1552, and two elaborate sculptural compositions to William Coryton, 1651, and Sir William, 1711, both in a style characteristic of the early 17th century.

Notable sites
St Mellion is also the location of Pentillie, a 17th-century castle and estate which has been the seat of the Coryton family since 1698. They had previously had an estate at West Newton Ferrers, also in St Mellion. The manor of Newton Ferrers (Niuuetona, Niweton, Niwetone) is recorded in the Domesday Book of 1086. Part of the manor was held by Reginald from Robert, Count of Mortain. There was half a hide of land and land for six ploughs. There were two ploughs, three serfs, three villeins, 12 smallholders, 12 acres of pasture, five cattle, 40 sheep and 10 goats. The value of this part was £1 though it had formerly been worth £1 10s.

The other part of the manor was also held by Reginald from Robert, Count of Mortain. There was one hide of land and land for eight ploughs. There were 10 villeins and 20 smallholders with one plough, three serfs, half a league of pasture, woodland two leagues long and one furlong wide. The value of this part was £1 10s. though it had formerly been worth £2.

The present house was built about 1686–95 (these dates being on the gatepiers) for Sir William Coryton. It is a plain granite mansion of two storeys: the centre is of seven bays and there are two projecting wings of two bays each. It is the earliest Cornish mansion in the classical style (i.e. with no Tudor survivals). Two thirds of the house were gutted by fire in 1940; of this some has been rebuilt while the rest remains as a ruin. The St Mellion golf course is also in the parish.

Crocadon Quarry, 200 metres east of St Mellion village, is a Site of Special Scientific Interest for its geology.

References

Sources

External links

 St Mellion Parish Council

Civil parishes in Cornwall
Sites of Special Scientific Interest in Cornwall
Villages in Cornwall